The Lanier family tree contains a number of musicians in the English royal court.  This tree is not complete but is focused on showing the relationship of the well-known members of the family.

Sources
Lanier Family History
Dedicated to Carol Middleton, Bassano and Lanier Genealogist
Genealogy of Robert Lanier from Barbados
 Peter Bassano

Family trees